Francis Peninsula, also known as Beaver Island, is a tidal island located on the west coast of the Sechelt Peninsula in British Columbia, Canada.

Etymology
The designation Francis Peninsula was officially adopted by BC Geographical Names in 1930. The name was changed to Beaver Island on 28 July 1945 as identified on British Admiralty Charts. BC Geographical Names reverted the name back to Francis Peninsula on 4 April 1972 in order to conform with its entrenched local usage.

Geography
Francis Peninsula forms the southern part of Pender Harbour. During high and neap tide, the peninsula is divided from the mainland by Bargain Narrows (an arm of Pender Harbour) and Bargain Bay. During low tide, the island rejoins the mainland to become a peninsula. A two-lane road connects the island to the mainland via a short bridge.

The island features two protected areas: Francis Point Provincial Park and Francis Point Ecological Reserve.

See also
Micou's Island

References

Tidal islands of Canada
Landforms of British Columbia
Sunshine Coast Regional District